Crystal Lake is an unincorporated community in Anderson County, located in the U.S. state of Texas. According to the Handbook of Texas, the community had a population of 20 in 2000. It is located within the Palestine, Texas micropolitan area.

History
Crystal Lake had several homes and a golf course in the 1930s. A church called Antioch Church and several scattered homes were located in the community in 1982 and only one business was reported in the community in 1985. It had a population of 20 in 2000.

Geography
It stands near a lake with the same name.

Economy
Crystal Lake is a thriving church and recreation community with fishing and camping facilities that are used by the Crystal Lake Country Club.

Education
Crystal Lake had a school that belonged to the Swanson Spring school district in the 1930s. It served 49 students in 1932 and was then consolidated with the Palestine Independent School District in 1955. Today the community is served by the Slocum Independent School District.

References

Unincorporated communities in Anderson County, Texas
Unincorporated communities in Texas